Ritt is a given name and a surname. Notable people with the name include:

Eugène Ritt (1817–1898), French theatermaker
Joseph Ritt (1893–1951), American mathematician at Columbia University
Martin Ritt (1914–1990), American director, actor, and playwright in both film and theater
Stefan Ritt (born 1964), German physicist
Ritt Bjerregaard (1941–2023), Danish politician
Ritt Momney (born 1999), American singer

See also
Der letzte Ritt nach Santa Cruz, (The Last Ride to Santa Cruz), 1964 German Western film
Der Ritt auf dem Schmetterling, controversial song by German punk band Die Ärzte
RIT (disambiguation)
Writ